The 2018 21.co.uk Shanghai Darts Masters was the third staging of the tournament by the Professional Darts Corporation and the second entry in the 2018 World Series of Darts. The tournament featured 16 players (eight PDC players facing eight regional qualifiers) and was held at the Pullman Hotel in Shanghai, China from 13–14 July 2018.  

Michael van Gerwen was the defending champion after defeating Dave Chisnall 8–0 in the final of the 2017 event, but he lost 8–4 in the semi-finals to Michael Smith.

Smith went on to win his first World Series title by beating Rob Cross 8–2 in the final.

Prize money
The total prize fund was £60,000.

Qualifiers

The eight invited PDC representatives are (seeded according to the 2018 World Series of Darts Order of Merit):

  Gary Anderson (first round)
  Rob Cross (runner-up)
  Peter Wright (semi-finals)
  Michael van Gerwen (semi-finals)
  James Wade (quarter-finals)
  Daryl Gurney (quarter-finals)
  Michael Smith (champion)
  Gerwyn Price (quarter-finals)

The Asian representatives will be:

The top 3 players from the PDC Asian Tour Order of Merit after Event 6.

  Royden Lam (quarter-finals)
  Lourence Ilagan (first round)
  Seigo Asada (first round)

Four winners of a Chinese qualifier.

  Zong Xiao Chen (first round)
  Yuanjun Liu (first round)
  Chengan Liu (first round)
  Lihao Wen (first round)

One other qualifier, the criteria for which has not been announced by the Professional Darts Corporation.
  Hai Long Chen (first round)

Draw

References

World Series of Darts
Sports competitions in Shanghai
Shanghai Darts Masters
Shanghai Darts Masters
Shanghai Darts Masters